Walker Lucas Clapp (April 15, 1851 – September 29, 1901) was an American politician in the state of Tennessee.

Early life 
Walker Lucas Clapp was born in 1851. His father, Judge Jeremiah W. Clapp, was elected to the Congress of the Confederate States. He grew up at Oakleigh in Holly Springs, Mississippi.

Clapp graduated from the University of Mississippi with a Bachelor of Arts degree in 1871. While there, he was a member of the Fraternity of Delta Psi (aka St. Anthony Hall). He studied law and was admitted to the bar in 1874.

Career 
Clapp practiced the Law with his father, a prominent attorney. During the American Civil War, Clapp served in the Confederate government, as director of the Produce Loan, appointed by Jefferson Davis.

In 1887, Clapp was selected as speaker of the Tennessee House of Representatives.  He served in that capacity until 1891.  He served as Mayor of Memphis from 1895 to 1898, when he lost by just over 500 votes to Joseph J. Williams.

Personal life and death 
He married Lamira Parker in 1874 and had four children. Clapp died on September 29, 1901, in Baltimore, Maryland.

References

External links 
 

1851 births
1901 deaths
People from Memphis, Tennessee
Mayors of Memphis, Tennessee
University of Mississippi alumni
Speakers of the Tennessee House of Representatives
Democratic Party members of the Tennessee House of Representatives
People of Tennessee in the American Civil War
19th-century American politicians
St. Anthony Hall